Jagbani is a Punjabi language newspaper that is circulated in the state of Punjab, India. It was started by the Punjab Kesari Group back in 1978 along with Punjab Kesari and Hind Samachar. This newspaper is printed in Jalandhar and Ludhiana and has an average of 328 thousand circulated copies during weekdays.

Prominent columnists

References

Punjabi-language newspapers published in India
Mass media in Punjab, India
Jalandhar
Ludhiana
Newspapers established in 1978
1978 establishments in Punjab, India